John Barr Murray Fleming (27 December 1889 – 21 March 1916) was a Scottish professional footballer who played in the Scottish League for St Bernard's and Rangers as a right half and forward. He also played in the Football League for Tottenham Hotspur and Newcastle United.

Personal life 
Fleming's brothers Adam and William were both footballers. He served as a lance corporal in the Queen's Own Cameron Highlanders during the First World War and died of pneumonia at Richmond Camp on 21 March 1916. Fleming was buried in Inveresk Parish Churchyard.

Career statistics

References

1916 deaths
Footballers from Falkirk (council area)
Scottish footballers
English Football League players
Association football midfielders
Newcastle United F.C. players
British Army personnel of World War I
Queen's Own Cameron Highlanders soldiers
British military personnel killed in World War I
Armadale F.C. players
Scottish Football League players
1889 births
Association football inside forwards
Bonnyrigg Rose Athletic F.C. players
Tottenham Hotspur F.C. players
Rangers F.C. players
St Bernard's F.C. players
Deaths from pneumonia in England